
Gmina Bejsce is a rural gmina (administrative district) in Kazimierza County, Świętokrzyskie Voivodeship, in south-central Poland.

Villages
Gmina Bejsce contains the villages and settlements of Bejsce, Brończyce, Czyżowice, Dobiesławice, Grodowice, Kaczkowice, Kijany, Królewice, Morawianki, Morawiany, Piotrkowice, Prokocice, Sędziszowice, Skała, Stojanowice, Uściszowice and Zbeltowice.

Neighbouring gminas
Gmina Bejsce is bordered by the gminas of Kazimierza Wielka, Koszyce and Opatowiec.

References

Polish official population figures 2006

External links
 The old website (archived)

Bejsce
Kazimierza County